The 2018 UCI Para-cycling Track World Championships were the World Championships for track cycling with athletes with a physical disability. The Championships took place in Rio de Janeiro, Brazil from 22–25 March 2018.

31 events were held on the track.

The championships

Brazil hosted the UCI Para-Cycling Track World Championships for the first time, at the Rio Olympic Velodrome located at the Barra Olympic and Paralympic Park. The  Championship was also the first one to mark points for the ranking that will select the Tokyo Paralympic Games athletes. The velodrome's 250m Siberian pine track is banked to an angle
of 12 degrees at its shallowest point and 42 degrees at its steepest point. The capacity is approximately 5,600.

Track events

31 events were held in all; 15 for men and women, and a mixed team sprint.

Events were held in five discipline; match sprint, team sprint, time trial, individual pursuit and scratch race, and across 6 disability classifications.

References

UCI Para-cycling Track World Championships
Cycle racing in Brazil
Parasports in Brazil
International sports competitions in Rio de Janeiro (city)
Para-cycling
UCI Paracycling
UCI Paracycling